The 2015 Wrestling World Cup – Men's freestyle was The last of a set of three Wrestling World Cups in 2015 .

Pool stage

Pool A     

{| class="wikitable outercollapse"
! POOL A
|-
| Round I

|-
| Round II

|-
| Round III

{| class="wikitable collapsible innercollapse"
!colspan=4|  5 -  3
|-
!Weight!!Belarus!!result!!Turkey
|-
|57 kg||Vladislav Andreev''||align=center|5 – 3||Sezar Akgül
|-
|61 kg||Dzianis Maksimov||align=center|4 – 14 ||Münir Recep Aktaş|-
|65 kg||Azamat Nurykau ||align=center|11 – 0||Mustafa Kartal
|-
|70 kg||Zhan Safian||align=center| – ||by forfeit
|-
|74 kg||Ali Shabanau||align=center|3 – 4 ||Soner Demirtaş|-
|86 kg||Serdar Böke||align=center|7 – 8 ||Aleksander Gostiev|-
|97 kg||Ivan Yankouski||align=center|20 – 9||İbrahim Bölükbaşı
|-
|125 kg||Aleksey Shemarov||align=center|10 – 0||Tanju Gemici
|}

|}

Pool B

{| class="wikitable outercollapse"
! POOL B
|-
| Round I|-
| Round II'''

Medal Matches

Final classement

See also
2015 Wrestling World Cup - Men's Greco-Roman

References

External links
 https://unitedworldwrestling.org
 https://unitedworldwrestling.org/event/world-cup-senior-7

2015 Wrestling World Cup
2015 in sports in California
2015 in American sports
International wrestling competitions hosted by the United States